Patti Page is a 1950 album by Patti Page, issued by Mercury Records as a 10" long-playing record, as catalog number MG-25059.

Track listing

References

1950 albums
Patti Page albums
Mercury Records albums